"Ch-Check It Out" is a song by alternative hip-hop group Beastie Boys, released as the first single off their sixth studio album, To the 5 Boroughs (2004), on May 3, 2004. The song heavily samples "(Sittin' On) The Dock of the Bay" by Peggy Lee. Following its appearance on an episode of American teen drama television series The O.C. in April 2004, the song was released as a single on May 3, 2004.

The song reached number one on the US Billboard Modern Rock Tracks chart and number 68 on the Billboard Hot 100. It also peaked at number eight on the UK Singles Chart and number one on the Canadian Singles Chart. In Australia, the song reached number 46 on the ARIA Singles Chart and was ranked number 28 on Triple J's Hottest 100 of 2004. "Ch-Check It Out" was nominated for Best Rap Performance by a Duo or Group at the 2005 Grammy Awards. Beastie Boys member MCA directed the song's music video under his pseudonym, Nathaniel Hörnblowér.

Critical reception
Reviewing the song for Billboard, Susanne Ault wrote that "Ch-Check It Out" harkens back to Beastie Boys' past works, calling the track "a bit retro" as well as its horns and bassline "much fun", comparing the chorus to the group's 1992 single "So What'cha Want". She went on to comment, "Still, with so many hits in their stable, it seems near impossible for the Beastie Boys not to compete with themselves with each successive track."

Music video
MCA directed the music video for the song under his pseudonym, Nathaniel Hörnblowér. It features the Beastie Boys performing the song while dressed in various costumes. The video was added to the playlists of MTV and MuchMusic on the week ending May 2, 2004, and to Fuse's playlist two weeks later, on May 16.

Live performances
Beastie Boys performed the song live on The Late Show with David Letterman. This performance was unusual, as it featured Beastie Boys performing the song while on their way to the studio. They began by emerging from a subway stop and walking through New York City until arriving at the Letterman studio and finishing the track inside. This performance has been regarded as one of the best musical moments on the program, with Paste magazine ranking it number 11 on their list of "David Letterman's 25 Greatest Music Moments".

Track listings

Canadian and Australian CD single
 "Ch-Check It Out"
 "Ch-Check It Out" (instrumental)
 "And Then I"

UK CD1
 "Ch-Check It Out"
 "Ch-Check It Out" (Just Blaze remix)

UK CD2
 "Ch-Check It Out"
 "Ch-Check It Out" (instrumental)
 "And Then I"
 "Ch-Check It Out" (video)

UK 12-inch single
A1. "Ch-Check It Out"
A2. "Ch-Check It Out" (instrumental)
B1. "Ch-Check It Out" (Just Blaze remix)
B2. "Ch-Check It Out" (a cappella)

Japanese maxi-CD single
 "Ch-Check It Out" (explicit version)
 "And Then I"
 "Ch-Check It Out" (Just Blaze remix)
 "Ch-Check It Out" (instrumental)
 "Ch-Check It Out" (explicit a cappella)

Credits and personnel
Credits are adapted from the UK CD single liner notes.

Studio
 Recorded and mixed at Oscilloscope Laboratories (New York City)

Personnel

 Beastie Boys – writing, vocals, production, engineering
 MixMasterMike – turntable extraordinaire
 Supa Engineer "DURO" – mixing
 Jon Weiner – engineering
 Freddie – assistant to the regional manager
 Piero Ribelli – photography
 Noel Yauch – illustration

Charts

Weekly charts

Year-end charts

Certifications

Release history

References

2004 singles
2004 songs
Beastie Boys songs
Capitol Records singles
Parlophone singles
Songs written by Ad-Rock
Songs written by Adam Yauch
Songs written by Mike D